Firdous Begum (born Parveen; 4 August 1947  16 December 2020), known mononymously as Firdous, was a Pakistani film actress known for her role in 1970's Heer Ranjha film. She appeared in more than 150 uncertain films, including one hundred thirty Punjabi, twenty Urdu and three Pushto films. She started her career as a supporting actress with film Fanoos in 1963, and later she played lead role in Malangi.

Biography 
She was born as Parveen in Lahore, British India on 4 August 1947. During her career, she met Akmal Khan, lead actor of Malangi, and later they married, however Akmal died in 1967. She then married Ejaz Durrani, her co-actor of Heer Ranjha. She had three children, including two sons and a daughter. Her other prominent films include Khandaan, Lai Laag and Aurat.

Filmography

Death
Firdous Begum died of brain hemorrhage on 16 December 2020 at age 73 at a local hospital in Lahore, Pakistan. Among her survivors are her three children – two sons and a daughter.

References

External links 
 

1947 births
2020 deaths
Actresses in Pashto cinema
Actresses in Punjabi cinema
Actresses in Urdu cinema
Actresses from Lahore
Nigar Award winners